John Symington Aspin (21 March 1877, Anderston, Glasgow – 19 February 1960) was a Scottish businessman and sailor who competed for the Royal Clyde Yacht Club at Hunters Quay and represented Great Britain at the 1908 Summer Olympics.

He was a crew member on the Hera which finished first of two teams competing in the 12 metre class. At the time, only the helmsman and mate were awarded gold medals, while the crew received silver medals. However, Aspin is credited as having received a gold medal in the official Olympic database.

References

External links
 
 

1877 births
1960 deaths
British male sailors (sport)
Scottish male sailors (sport)
Olympic sailors of Great Britain
Olympic gold medallists for Great Britain
Olympic medalists in sailing
Medalists at the 1908 Summer Olympics
Sailors at the 1908 Summer Olympics – 12 Metre
Sportspeople from Glasgow
Scottish businesspeople
Scottish Olympic medallists